N-Octyl bicycloheptene dicarboximide (MGK 264) is an ingredient in some common pesticides.  It has no intrinsic pesticidal qualities itself, but rather is a synergist enhancing the potency of pyrethroid ingredients.  It is used in a variety of household and veterinary products.

MGK 264 is starting to appear on pesticide monitoring lists by states legalizing and mandating pesticide monitoring in medical and recreational cannabis. This is most likely due to the very large amounts of pyrethrenoids that are used in cannabis monitoring lists and the likelihood of MGK 264 usage to maximize yield.

References

External links 
 PDF of EPA document on this chemical
 N-Octyl Bicycloheptene Dicarboximide (MGK-264) Reregistration, Environmental Protection Agency, 2006

Insecticides
Imides
Cycloalkenes